Chondrosiida is an order of sea sponges within the subclass Verongimorpha.

References

Sponge orders
Verongimorpha